Tijana Ibrahimovic is an entertainment journalist and TV personality. She was born in the city of Sombor in Northern Serbia, the province of Vojvodina, Yugoslavia at the time. She first left her native country to complete Serbo-Hungarian high school in Budapest, Hungary. She moved to the US as an international student and attended the City University of New York.

Education 
Tijana holds a Bachelor of Arts degree from Brooklyn College. She also studied theater management at the Borough of Manhattan Community College in New York where she completed an associate's degree.

Early life 
Born in Serbia Tijana is fluent in Serbian and other languages of former Yugoslavia. She also speaks Hungarian but attributes her passionate and outgoing personality to her Balkan roots. 
Tijana fell in love with theater as a child and wanted to be an actress so as a member of the theater group she volunteered for smaller non speaking roles at the local theater. She also competed in reciting and qualified for a national competition. This is where unknowingly her training for broadcast journalism started. Upon graduating from high school she was accepted to acting school in Belgrade but her desire to build international career lead her to New York City.

Professional career 
Upon graduating from Brooklyn College she briefly worked as a news anchor for the Radio Television of Vojvodina, where she gained a lot of experience, but it was clear entertainment was her call.

Since, she covered/hosted red-carpets, film premiers, events and fashion shows for Elle Serbia, Jones Magazine, Fashion One, Examiner.com, The Source, Vigore! Magazine, The Sybarite, Fashion Reverie, The Knockturnal, Glammonitor, Style Music TV and Wannabe Magazine. She was a regular on Wetpaint show "The Tea".

Notable interviews: Oscar de la Renta, Joan Rivers, Kelsey Grammer, Bette Midler, Debra Messing, Katherine, Crown Princess of Yugoslavia and many others.

In 2015 Tijana founded Pop Style TV channel and website. She is the host and executive producer of their videos. The channel covers entertainment, music and fashion and provides viewers with the latest news from the entertainment industry.

She is also known for her philanthropic work with the "Save St. Sava" annual benefit in efforts to help rebuild Serbian Orthodox Cathedral of St. Sava destroyed by fire in 2016.

References

External links 
Official website

Year of birth missing (living people)
Living people
American women journalists
Serbian expatriates in the United States
Brooklyn College alumni
Borough of Manhattan Community College alumni
21st-century American women